This is a list of earthquakes in 2004. Only earthquakes of magnitude 6 or above are included, unless they resulted in significant damage or casualties, or were notable for some other reason. All dates are listed according to UTC time. The year 2004 had the most major earthquakes since 1999. In total, there were 16 magnitude 7.0+ earthquakes this year, 6 of them were in Indonesia. Most of the earthquake deaths in 2004 were caused by the magnitude 9.1–9.3 earthquake 
off the west coast of Sumatra in December. Most of the deaths were caused by a devastating tsunami that spread across the Indian Ocean. There were several other deadly and destructive earthquakes, including Morocco's largest earthquake to date, which caused 628 deaths. Japan was hit by a magnitude 6.6 earthquake, which caused 68 deaths and $28 billion in damages, making it the fourth costliest earthquake in history.

Compared to other years

Overall

By death toll

 Note: At least 10 dead

By magnitude    

 Note: At least 7.0 magnitude

By month

January

One person died and 29 were injured, with 6,000 buildings damaged throughout Bali and Lombok.
Minor damage was caused in Guerrero and power outages occurred in Mexico City.
 A magnitude 2.2 earthquake struck Banska-Bystrica, Slovakia on January 10 at a depth of 5.0 km (3.1 mi). Minor damage was caused in Slovenská Ľupča.
 A magnitude 4.5 earthquake offshore Algiers, Algeria on January 10 at a depth of 10.0 km (6.2 mi). Three people were injured and additional damage was caused to buildings previously weakened by the 2003 Boumerdès earthquake.
 A magnitude 6.2 earthquake struck Kavieng, Papua New Guinea on January 15 at a depth of 10.0 km (6.2 mi).
A magnitude 6.2 earthquake struck the Mid-Atlantic Ridge on January 16 at a depth of 10.0 km (6.2 mi).
 A magnitude 6.1 earthquake struck the Southeast Pacific Rise at a depth of 10.0 km (6.2 mi).

February

 A magnitude 7.3 earthquake struck Papua, Indonesia on February 7 at a depth of 
Four people were injured and a landslide occurred at Ma'in.
 A magnitude 4.7 earthquake Burundi on February 24 at a depth of 10.0 km (6.2 mi). Three people were killed and 24 houses were destroyed in Ruyaga.
Between 628 and 631 people were killed and 926 were injured.

March

 A magnitude 6.1 earthquake struck Hihifo, Tonga on March 14 At a Depth .

April

 A magnitude 6.0 earthquake struck Iwaki, Japan on April 3 at a depth of 
At least three people died and five were injured.
 A magnitude 4.1 earthquake struck Bolu Province, Turkey on April 13 at depth of 5.0 km (3.1 mi). Four people were injured in Bolu.
 A magnitude 6.2 earthquake struck La Cruz, Costa Rica on April 27 at a depth of 10.0 km (6.2 mi)

May

Two people were killed and one injured by a rockslide in Hualien County and a bridge collapsed at Taroko National Park. 
 A magnitude 5.5 earthquake struck Qinghai, China on May 4 at a depth of 13.5 km (8.4 mi). More than 3,100 houses were damaged and thousands of people were left homeless in Delingha.
 A magnitude 4.5 earthquake struck Balochistan, Pakistan on May 8 at a depth of 10.0 km (6.2 mi). One person was killed, thirty injured and minor damage was caused in Quetta.
 A magnitude 6.4 earthquake struck Kavieng, Papua New Guinea on May 13 at a depth of 10 km (6.2 mi).

June

 A magnitude 6.4 earthquake struck the western Indian Ridge on June 9 at a depth of 10.0 km (6.2 mi).
 A magnitude 4.6 earthquake struck Tabuk, Saudi Arabia on June 9 at a depth of 10.0 km (6.2 mi). Minor damage was observed in the epicentral area.

July

Eighteen people were killed.
One person died and five others were injured by a rockslide at Bovec.
 A magnitude 4.6 earthquake struck Herat Province, Afghanistan on July 18 at a depth of 10.0 km (6.2 mi). 150 houses were damaged in the western part of the province.
One person died, two people were injured and five houses were severely damaged at Lake Rotoma.
 A magnitude 5.2 earthquake struck Paktia Province, Afghanistan on July 18 at a depth of 10.0 km (6.2 mi). Two people were killed, forty were injured and hundreds of houses were destroyed in Paktia.
 A magnitude 4.8 earthquake struck Doğubayazıt, Turkey on July 30 at a depth of 5.0 km (3.1 mi). One person was killed and five were injured.

August

 A magnitude 5.6 earthquake struck Mugla Province, Turkey on August 4 at a depth of 10.0 km (6.2 mi). Fifteen people were injured in Bodrum.
Two people were injured in Mansehra, Pakistan.
Four people died, nearly 600 were injured and 84,157 homes were damaged or destroyed.
One person was killed, eleven were injured and some damage was caused.

September

Four people were injured in Kyoto. This was a foreshock of the 7.4 earthquake several hours later.
Forty people were injured in Kyoto and a tsunami of around one metre (3 feet) was observed.
 A magnitude 5.2 earthquake struck Gansu Province, China on September 7 at a depth of 10.0 km (6.2 mi). Nineteen people were injured, 600 houses were destroyed and 3,800 damaged in Gansu.
Power outages occurred in parts of Central Luzon.
Three people were injured and seventeen houses were damaged at Kaliningrad. A railtrack was damaged in Svetlogorsk, while minor damage occurred in Suwałki, Poland. Damage was estimated to have exceeded 140 million rubles.
Minor damage was observed in Parkfield, San Miguel, and Shandon.

October

One person was injured and two houses were damaged in Tokyo.
Sixty people were injured.
 A magnitude 6.8 earthquake struck Kirakira, Solomon Islands on October 8 at a depth of 
Several people were injured and some damage was caused in Taipei.
Twelve people were injured and 20,000 buildings were damaged.
It was an aftershock of the 6.6 earthquake only 7 minutes prior.

November

 A magnitude 6.7 earthquake struck the Vancouver Island on November 2 at the depth of 
 A magnitude 7.5 earthquake struck Alor Island, Indonesia on November 11, at a depth of only . 23 people were killed.
 A magnitude 7.1 earthquake struck West Papua, Indonesia on November 26, at a depth of  32 people were killed, and over 200 were injured.
Ten people were injured.
Eight people Were killed and 500 homes were destroyed.
One person was killed and thirteen were injured. A small tsunami was generated.
Nine people were injured and minor damage occurred in Brescia.

December

 A magnitude 4.5 earthquake struck Boumerdes on December 5 at the depth of 10 km (6.2 mi). 46 people were injured in Zemmouri.
Some buildings, roads and water lines were damaged at Tomamae.
 A magnitude 6.8 earthquake struck off the southern coast of the Cayman Islands on December 14 at the depth of 10 km (6.2 mi). .
 A magnitude 8.1 earthquake struck near Macquarie Island on December 23, at a depth of 10 km (6.2 mi.), and a Modified Mercalli Intensity of V (Moderate).
The waves reached as far as Africa.
It is an aftershock of the magnitude 9.1 earthquake 3 hours prior.
Note: Due to cluttering, the aftershocks of the 9.1 magnitude earthquake off the west coast of Sumatra on December 26 was excluded.

References

2004
 
2004 natural disasters
2004